This is a list of works on the subject of wartime cross-dressing.

List

General

United States

American Civil War

Others

See also
 List of wartime cross-dressers
 Soldier Studies: Cross-Dressing in the Wehrmacht
 The Female Marine
 Bibliography of works on the United States military and LGBT+ topics

Cross-dressing and the military
Bibliographies of wars and conflicts
Cross-dressing-related lists
+